The Amazonian Craton is a geologic province located in South America. It occupies a large portion of the central, north and eastern part of the continent and represents one of Earth's largest cratonic regions. The Guiana Shield and Central Brazil Shield (Guaporé Shield) constitute respectively the northern and southern exhumed parts of the craton. Between the two shields lies the Amazon Rift, a zone of weakness within the craton. Smaller cratons  of Precambrian rocks south of the Amazonian Shield are the Río de la Plata Craton and the São Francisco Craton, which lies to the east.

The Río Apa Craton at the Paraguay-Brazil border is considered be likely just the southern part of the Amazonian Craton. The rocks of Río Apa were deformed during the Sunsás orogeny.

It has been suggested that the Late Mesoproterozoic–Early Neoproterozoic aged Sveconorwegian Orogen in Fennoscandia could have been caused by a  continent–continent collision between the Amazonia and Baltica. The question is open if Telemarkia terrane in Norway was derived from the Amazonian Craton but this possibility does not imply necessarily that there was a continental collision.

See also

References

Further reading 
 

Cratons
Geology of South America
Historical tectonic plates
Historical continents
Geology of Brazil
Precambrian South America
Geology of Santa Cruz Department (Bolivia)